Tan Tieniu FREng is a professor at the Institute of Automation of the Chinese Academy of Sciences, China. Concurrently, he is deputy chief of the Hong Kong Liaison Office.

Early life
Tan was born in Hunan Province, China, in 1964. He was educated in Xi'an Jiaotong University in 1984. In 1989, he received his PhD in Electrical and Electronics Engineering from Imperial College London.

Career
Tan joined University of Reading, UK, as a research fellow after his Ph.D. In 1998, he returned to China. He joined Chinese Academy of Sciences as a professor at the Institute of Automation. He was a Vice President at the Chinese Academy of Sciences (2013–2014). His research focuses on biometrics and pattern recognition. He was former President of the IEEE Biometrics Council. He is also the editor-in-chief of the International Journal on Automation and Computing. He is an adjunct professor at University of Science and Technology of China. He was sanctioned by the US Government on 16 July 2021 under Executive Order 13936.

Awards
Tan is a Fellow of IEEE, Fellow of the Royal Academy of Engineering, UK, and a Member of the Chinese Academy of Sciences.

References

Notes 

Living people
Chinese computer scientists
Fellow Members of the IEEE
Members of the Chinese Academy of Sciences
Xi'an Jiaotong University alumni
Alumni of Imperial College London
Academic staff of the University of Science and Technology of China
Year of birth missing (living people)
Specially Designated Nationals and Blocked Persons List
Individuals sanctioned by the United States under the Hong Kong Autonomy Act
Members of the 14th Chinese People's Political Consultative Conference